Italy competed at the 2021 European Athletics Indoor Championships in Toruń, Poland, from 5 to 7 March 2021 with 44 athletes.

Medalists

Finalists (top eight)
Twelve was the Italian finalists at this edition of the European Athletics Indoor Championships, six men and four women and the two relays team.

Selected competitors

Men (22)

Women (22)

See also
 Italy national athletics team

References

External links
 EAA official site 

2021
2021 European Athletics Indoor Championships
2021 in Italian sport